Aleksandr Vladimirovich Pavlenko (born 23 November 1976) is a Russian professional football coach and a former player. He works as a coach for FC FShM-Torpedo Moscow.

Club career
He made his professional debut in the Russian Third Division in 1994 for FC Spartak-d Moscow.

Honours
 Russian Premier League champion: 1996.
 Latvian Higher League 3rd place: 2001, 2002.

References

1976 births
Footballers from Moscow
Living people
Russian footballers
Russian football managers
FC Spartak Moscow players
FC Tyumen players
FK Liepājas Metalurgs players
Russian expatriate footballers
Expatriate footballers in Latvia
Russian expatriate sportspeople in Latvia
FC Oryol players
Russian Premier League players
FC Irtysh Omsk players
Association football midfielders
FC Yenisey Krasnoyarsk players
FC Spartak-2 Moscow players